Charles Dietrich is the name of:

Charles E. Dietrich (1889–1942), U.S. Representative from Pennsylvania
Charles Henry Dietrich (1853–1924), governor of, and a U.S. Senator from, Nebraska